Unciano Colleges (UC), Inc. is a private school with branches in Sta. Mesa, Manila and in Antipolo City. The institution is known for its medical science programs and is affiliated the Unciano Colleges and General Hospital in Manila (45years).

The Antipolo campus has been providing tertiary education for 29 years now. It provides undergraduate courses in Medical Technology, Nursing, Physical Therapy, and Radiologic Technology. Aside from these allied health courses, the campus also has a Hospitality and Tourism Management department with BS Hotel and Restaurant Management and BS Tourism Management. Additionally, the school currently offers basic education, including Senior High School (SHS). Interested SHS students have the option of choosing between the ABM strand and the STEM strand.

Universities and colleges in Manila
Hospitals in Manila
Teaching hospitals in the Philippines
Buildings and structures in Santa Mesa
Education in Santa Mesa
Educational institutions established in 1976
1976 establishments in the Philippines